Chouteau Lock & Dam, also identified as Chouteau Lock & Dam 17, is 17th lock and dam of the McClellan-Kerr Arkansas River Navigation System (MKARNS) from the Mississippi River to its terminus at the Tulsa Port of Catoosa, and is the first lock and dam on the Verdigris River in Oklahoma, just above the Three Forks junction with the Arkansas River. Construction of this facility started in 1966 and was completed in 1970. The estimated cost of Chouteau Lock & Dam was $ 31.8 million.

The lock and dam was named for the family of Auguste Pierre Chouteau (1786-1838), who was a pioneer European that settled in this area during the late 18th and early 19th Century.

Reservoir description
The lift is

Dam description
The Chouteau Dam is gravity type, of earthen construction.

Recreation

Fishing and hunting
The MKARNS is often referred to as "the Ditch" by fishermen, who find the waterway an excellent source of fish, especially largemouth and white  bass. Other species normally present are: crappie, channel catfish, flatheads and sunfish. Persons fishing from boats are cautioned to watch for submerged tree stumps and logs.

Hunting is allowed in the Wildlife Management Area. Principal game species include: white tailed deer, dove, quail squirrel, rabbit, turkey and several species of migratory water fowl..

Camping and picnicking 
The Corps manages three areas that abut the Chouteau pool:  Afton Landing, Tullahassee Loop and Coal Creek.  Camping is allowed in Afton and Tullahassee.  Camping in undesignated areas is prohibited.  Camping and day use fees are collected by self deposit at Afton Landing. Tullahassee and Coal Creek facilities are free. Coal Creek is limited to boat launching and day use. Afton Landing also has a group picnic shelter..

Trails
The Jean Pierre Chouteau Trail is no longer maintained.

Major repair of Lock 17
The "pintle ball", a vital piece of equipment for the Chouteau Lock, was found to be damaged and in need of total replacement during a routine dewatering of the lock in 2009. This required obtaining an identical replacement, dewatering the lock again, lifting the gate, removing the old ball and installing its replacement, then refilling the lock Such an operation had never been attempted by the Tulsa District of the U.S. Army Corps of Engineers (ACE). Complicating the operation was the fact that there were no plans or drawings to show how the work should be done, and there were no spare pintal ball parts available. The replacement would have to be designed and constructed anew. Since installing the device would require closing the lock to traffic for a minimum of three weeks, scheduling was critical to minimize costs. The ACE planned to close the lock and start the dewatering on August 27, 2012. Reopening the lock to normal traffic was scheduled for September 6, 2012.

Notes

References 

Dams completed in 1970
Geography of Wagoner County, Oklahoma